Bliss is the fourth studio album by French singer Vanessa Paradis, released on 21 October 2000 by Barclay. It contains the single "Commando".

Background and release
The album proved to be one of her least successful efforts, with none of the singles reaching the  1 spot in France as anticipated. However, it is notable because American actor Johnny Depp performed on some of the tracks. It also marks the recording debut of Lily Rose Depp, Johnny and Vanessa's daughter, as she is featured on one track. Fans also note Bliss for its extensive artwork, all of which was hand-painted by Vanessa and Johnny, with use of watercolors.

Despite a weak chart run, Bliss spawned a few minor hit singles. The primary one was "Pourtant", which is often regarded as Paradis' most poetic work. Singles "Commando" and "Que fait la vie" were the other single releases from the album.

The album topped the French Albums Chart and spent 49 weeks on the chart.

Track listing
 "L'eau et le vin" (Alain Bashung, Didier Golemanas, Richard Mortier) – 4:36
 "Commando" (Golemanas, Franck Langolff) – 3:40
 "When I Say" (Matthieu Chedid, Paradis) – 3:57
 "Pourtant" (Chedid, Franck Monnet) – 3:36
 "Que fait la vie?" (Golemanas, Paradis) – 4:20
 "Les acrobates" (Monnet, Paradis) – 3:42
 "La La La Song" (Gerry DeVeaux, Paradis) – 4:26
 "L'air du temps" (Chedid, Paradis) – 4:19
 "St. Germain" (Johnny Depp, Paradis) – 2:36
 "Dans mon café" (Golemanas, Langolff) – 4:30
 "Firmaman" (Paradis) – 4:41
 "La ballade de Lily Rose" (Paradis) – 2:33
 "Bliss" (Depp, Paradis) – 4:16

Personnel
 Eric Bobo – percussion
 Matthieu Chédid – guitar, Mini Moog, shaker
 Pierre-Alain Dahan – drums
 Jon "JD" Dickson – French horn
 Mark Goldenberg – guitar
 Henry Hirsh – bass, Wurlitzer
 Rob Klonel – drums
 Nick Lane – trombone
 Norman Langolff – bass, Farfisa organ
 Vanessa Paradis – vocals
 Craig Ross – drums, guitar
 Vincent Ségal – cello
 Benmont Tench – keyboards 
 Pete Thomas – drums, percussion
 Lee Thornburg – trumpet
 Bruce Witkin – bass, double bass, guitar
 David Woodford – saxophone

Charts

Weekly charts

Year-end charts

Certifications

References

2000 albums
Barclay (record label) albums
Vanessa Paradis albums